David F. Labaree is a historian of education and Lee L. Jacks Professor of Education at Stanford University.

Works 

 A Perfect Mess: The Unlikely Ascendancy of American Higher Education (2017)
 Someone Has to Fail: The Zero-Sum Game of Public Schooling (2010)
 The Trouble with Ed Schools (2004)
 How to Succeed in School Without Really Learning: The Credentials Race in American Education (1997)
 The Making of an American High School: The Credentials Market and the Central High School of Philadelphia, 1838–1939 (1988)

References

External links 

 

1947 births
American historians of education
Stanford University faculty
Harvard University alumni
University of Pennsylvania alumni
Sociologists of education
Living people